McElroy Memorial Associate Reformed Presbyterian Church was organized June 3, 1953. It was formerly Candler Road Associate Reformed Presbyterian Church, organized February 13, 1949. The building, now for sale, stands at 3593 Clairmont Road, Chamblee, Georgia, United States, in DeKalb County.  The church included the Albert W. Krueger Educational Unit, Erected 1956.  For a number of years, it operated McElroy Presbyterian Kindergarten.

Buildings and structures in DeKalb County, Georgia
Presbyterian churches in Georgia (U.S. state)